Giedrius Titenis (born 21 July 1989) is a Lithuanian swimmer, who specialized in breaststroke events. He is a four-time Olympian, a multiple-time Lithuanian record holder in the men's breaststroke, and a double swimming champion in the same discipline at the 2011 Summer Universiade in Shenzhen, China. Titenis is also a member of Anykščiai Swimming Club, and is coached and trained by Žilvinas Ovsiukas.

Swimming career
Titenis is considered one of Lithuania's top male swimmers, having achieved more than a hundred titles at the national championships, and having broken numerous records in men's breaststroke (50, 100, and 200 m), and medley relays (200 and 400 m). Titenis made his international debut at the 2006 FINA Youth World Swimming Championships in Rio de Janeiro, Brazil, where he earned a bronze medal in the men's 200 m breaststroke, with a time of 2:16.57. The following year, Titenis repeated his bronze medal triumph in the 100 m breaststroke at the 2007 European Junior Swimming Championships in Antwerp, Belgium, attaining his junior-best time of 1:02.51.

2008 Summer Olympics

Titenis guaranteed his spot on the Lithuanian team for the 2008 Summer Olympics in Beijing, by obtaining an A-standard entry time of 1:00.92 (100 m breaststroke) from the 2007 FINA World Championships in Melbourne, Australia. On the first night of the Games, Titenis 
challenged seven other swimmers in a top seeded heat, including former Olympic medalists Roman Sludnov of Russia (2000), and Brendan Hansen of the United States (2004). He picked up a second spot by nearly half a second (0.50) behind France's Hugues Duboscq, lowering his time to 1:00.11. At the end of the evening preliminaries, Titenis recorded a sixth fastest time to advance further into the semifinals. The following morning, Titenis fell short in his bid for the final, as he placed twelfth in the semifinal run by five hundredths of a second (0.05) behind Bulgaria's Mihail Alexandrov, with a fourth slowest time of 1:00.66.

2009 season

2009 Summer Universiade
At the 2009 Summer Universiade in Belgrade, Serbia, Titenis set a new Lithuanian record time of 59.94 seconds in the men's 100 m breaststroke, but narrowly missed out of the medal by four hundredths of a second (0.04) behind Japan's Hiromasa Sakimoto. In his second event, 200 m breaststroke, Titenis achieved his third career bronze medal by eight hundredths of a second (0.08) ahead of Brazil's Tales Cerdeira in 2:11.14.

2009 World Championships

Shortly after the Summer Universiade, Titenis drastically extended his swimming program by competing in all breaststroke events at the 2009 FINA World Championships in Rome. In his first event, 100 m breaststroke, Titenis out-touched Ukraine's Igor Borysik by one tenth of a second (0.10) on the morning preliminaries, lowering his national record to 59.24. He progressed further to the final round, but managed to finish only in sixth place, outside his record time of 59.27 seconds. The following morning, Titenis set his personal best time and Lithuanian record of 27.57 in the preliminary heats of his second event, 50 m breaststroke, but failed to advance into the semi-finals. For his third and final individual event, 200 m breaststroke, Titenis rebounded from his upset in two previous races, and shared a bronze medal triumph with Australian swimmer and world-record holder Christian Sprenger, clocking at 2:07.80. Two days later, Titenis joined with his fellow swimmers Paulius Viktoravičius, Vytautas Janušaitis, and Rimvydas Šalčius for the 4 × 100 m medley relay. Swimming the breaststroke leg, Titenis recorded a time of 59.26, and the Lithuanian team went on to finish the preliminary heats in fourth place and fifteenth overall, setting a new Lithuanian record time of 3:35.40.

At the 2009 European Short Course Swimming Championships in Istanbul, Turkey, Titenis set short-course Lithuanian records of 58.03 and 2:07.65 in the men's 100 and 200 m breaststroke, respectively, but failed to advance into the final round.

2011 season
At the 2011 FINA World Championships in Shanghai, Titenis competed for the second time in all breaststroke events. For his first event, 100 m breaststroke, Titenis finished in a sixth-place tie with Hungary's Dániel Gyurta, with a time of 1:00.25. The following morning, Titenis failed to improve both his performance and a national record of 27.57 seconds in the preliminary heats of the 50 m breaststroke, with a time of 28.14. For his third and final individual event, 200 m breaststroke, Titenis recorded a fastest time of 2:10.33 in the preliminary heats, but managed to finish only in sixth place on the final round by four tenths of a second (0.40) behind Great Britain's Michael Jamieson, clocking at 2:11.07.

Few weeks after the World Championships, Titenis rebounded from his loss by winning two gold medals in the same stroke at the 2011 Summer Universiade in Shenzhen, China. He tied with New Zealand's Glenn Snyders for the 200 m breaststroke title at 2:10.85, but edged him out of the gold medal in the 100 m by thirty-two hundredths of a second (0.32), posting his time of 1:00.39.

2012 Summer Olympics

Four years after competing in his first Olympics, Titenis qualified for his second Lithuanian team, as a 23-year-old, at the 2012 Summer Olympics in London, by clearing two FINA A-standard entry times of 1:00.25 (100 m breaststroke) and 2:10.33 (200 m breaststroke), both from the 2011 FINA World Championships in Shanghai, China.

On the first day of the Olympics, Titenis recorded the third fastest qualifying time of 59.68 in the preliminary heats of the 100 m breaststroke by six hundredths of a second (0.06) behind Australia's Christian Sprenger. He lowered his time to 59.66 in the semifinals, but was unable to break a minute barrier, when he finished eighth in the final by nearly a second behind Italy's Fabio Scozzoli at 1:00.84. Achieving his best finish, Titenis became the second Lithuanian swimmer in history to reach an Olympic final since Vytautas Janušaitis did so in 2004, until his teammate Rūta Meilutytė surprisingly won the gold medal in the same stroke by the following evening.

Three days later, Titenis challenged seven other swimmers on the fifth heat of the 200 m breaststroke, including two-time Olympic champion Kosuke Kitajima of Japan. He edged out Germany's Marco Koch to snare a third spot in his heat by a quarter of a second (0.25) in 2:10.36. Titenis recorded an eighth fastest time in the preliminary heats to secure his spot for the semifinals. On the evening session, Titenis failed to qualify for the final as he finished his semifinal run in eleventh place, dipping under a 2:10 barrier and lowering his qualified entry time to 2:09.95.

2016 Summer Olympics

Swimming two individual races and a relay in his third Olympics, Titenis failed to reach any finals, being at most a semifinalist in the 100 m breaststroke with 59.80.

Personal bests

International championships (50 m)

References

External links
NBC Olympics Profile

1989 births
Living people
Lithuanian male breaststroke swimmers
Olympic swimmers of Lithuania
Swimmers at the 2008 Summer Olympics
Swimmers at the 2012 Summer Olympics
Swimmers at the 2016 Summer Olympics
World Aquatics Championships medalists in swimming
European Aquatics Championships medalists in swimming
Universiade medalists in swimming
Sportspeople from Anykščiai
Universiade gold medalists for Lithuania
Universiade bronze medalists for Lithuania
Medalists at the 2009 Summer Universiade
Medalists at the 2011 Summer Universiade
Swimmers at the 2020 Summer Olympics